Wilhelm Stich (26 November 1894 – date of death unknown) was a German Nazi Party official who served as the first Gauleiter of Gau East Prussia in the Party's early days.

Life
Stich was born in Rogahlen in East Prussia, now named Rogale and located in Poland. He was the son of a salesman, also named Wilhelm Stich, and his wife Wilhelmine Dublaski. Not much is known about his education and early life. He was employed as a commercial clerk in Königsberg, the East Prussian capital, and on 8 April 1920 married Herta Maria Stich, daughter of August Stich and Justine Kimm.

Stich joined the Nazi Party in 1925 (membership number 18,327) shortly after the lifting of the ban that had been imposed on it in the wake of the Beer Hall Putsch of November 1923. He was a co-founder of the Ortsgruppe (Local Group) in Königsberg and became the Ortsgruppenleiter . On 6 December 1925, Gau East Prussia was officially established and Stich became its first Gauleiter. Stich also formed a branch of the National Socialist Working Association in Königsberg. This was an association of northern and northwestern Gauleiters who belonged to the “revolutionary” left wing of the Party, as opposed to the more moderate wing that supported participation in electoral campaigns.

By early 1926, Stich had been ousted from his Gauleiter position due to his inability to solve the financial problems of the Gau. He was succeeded as Gauleiter by Bruno Gustav Scherwitz on 1 February 1926. Stich was expelled from the Party but was permitted to re-enroll in 1928. No further details of his life are known.

References

Sources

1894 births
Year of death missing
Gauleiters
National Socialist Working Association members
Nazi Party officials
People from East Prussia